The 1903 Philadelphia Athletics football season  was their second, and last, season in existence. The team played independently of any league since the first National Football League ceased operations in 1902. The Athletics only played two recorded games in 1903, posting a 1-0-1 record.

Schedule

Game notes

References

Philadelphia Athletics (NFL)